The World of Wooster is a comedy television series, based on the Jeeves stories by author P. G. Wodehouse. The television series starred Ian Carmichael as English gentleman Bertie Wooster and Dennis Price as Bertie's valet Jeeves.

The series aired on BBC Television from 1965 until 1967 in three series.

Like many other British television series of the time, much of the series was lost as a result of wiping. All but two episodes are now lost. In 2018, the series was included at #51 in a list of the top 100 most wanted missing television programmes by television archivist organisation Kaleidoscope.

Cast members

Principal cast
 Ian Carmichael as Bertie Wooster
 Dennis Price as Jeeves

Recurring cast
 Derek Nimmo as Bingo Little (5 episodes)
 Eleanor Summerfield as Aunt Dahlia (5 episodes)
 Fabia Drake as Aunt Agatha (4 episodes)

Background and production
The series was produced by Michael Mills, Peter Cotes, and Frank Muir, with music by Sandy Wilson. The episodes were adapted from the stories of P. G. Wodehouse by Richard Waring and producer Michael Mills.

Twenty episodes, each about 30 minutes long, were made for the series. Minimal, economical sets were used, and Bertie's apartment had a contemporary design, including a central staircase and intricate screen door.

In some ways, the interpretations of Bertie Wooster and Jeeves in the series differ from how the characters are described in Wodehouse's stories. Ian Carmichael portrayed Bertie Wooster with the nervous mannerisms that he had earlier brought to affable, bewildered characters in comedy films such as Lucky Jim, and added a stammer and a monocle, both non-canonical, to the character. He was also significantly older than the canonical Bertie Wooster. Dennis Price portrayed Jeeves as an older, stiff, dignified figure, regarding himself as superior to the proceedings around him, rather than being more involved like the canonical Jeeves. Additionally, changes were made to the dialogue and situations to increase the tension between Jeeves and Aunt Agatha.

The series was successful, but after twenty episodes, Carmichael and others believed that they had adapted all the stories suitable for television. A serial adaptation of the Jeeves novel The Code of the Woosters was considered, though the idea of changing the series from an anthology to serial format was rejected. Instead, another series, The World of Wodehouse, was created to adapt other short stories written by Wodehouse.

Theme song
The theme song, "What Would I Do Without You Jeeves?" was sung (in character) by series lead Ian Carmichael. An extended single version also featuring Dennis Price as Jeeves was released with another in-character song by Carmichael, "Bertie's Lucky Day" on the b-side.

Episodes

Series overview

Series 1 (1965)

Series 2 (1966)

Series 3 (1967)

Reception
The series was distributed worldwide. It won awards for best script and comedy in 1965 from the Guild of Television Producers and Directors.

Wodehouse initially felt that Carmichael would be fine as Bertie Wooster, but later believed that Carmichael overacted; however, Wodehouse was satisfied enough with Carmichael's performance to later ask him to portray Bertie or Jeeves in a musical comedy. Carmichael declined, feeling he was too old to play Bertie again and that public perception prevented him from playing Jeeves. Wodehouse was more positive about Price's portrayal as Jeeves, stating that Price was the best Jeeves he had ever seen.

References
Notes

Sources

External links

 

1965 British television series debuts
1967 British television series endings
Television shows based on works by P. G. Wodehouse
BBC television comedy
Lost BBC episodes
1960s British comedy television series